Perdido Key State Park is a  Florida State Park located on a barrier island fifteen miles (24 km) southwest of Pensacola, off S.R. 292, in northwestern Florida. The address is 12301 Gulf Beach Highway.

Perdido Key State Park 

Barrier islands protect the Florida mainland from the harsh effects of storms and provide habitats for shorebirds and other coastal animals. The wide, white, sandy beaches and the rolling sand dunes covered with sea oats make this a pristine oasis along the rapidly developing panhandle. The beach, which provides excellent opportunities for swimming and sunbathing, is the focal point for public use of the park. Surf fishing is another popular activity. Boardwalks from the parking lot allow visitors to access the beach without causing damage to the fragile dunes and beach vegetation. Covered picnic tables overlooking the beach provide a great place for family outings.

Several endangered species inhabit, nest on or use this park. Most notable of these is the Perdido Key beach mouse. This mouse is one of the North America's rarest mammals and only currently exists in two places on earth, both of which are located on Perdido Key. The Johnson Beach Unit of Gulf Islands National Seashore is the other location. The mouse was reintroduced to the park in February 2000 after several years of being absent from the park. Originally, three pairs of juvenile mice were translocated from Johnson Beach, followed by an additional 16 pairs of juvenile mice the following year. The population of this mouse can vary greatly depending on the time of year and recent weather conditions, as well as the presence of house cats. Loggerhead sea turtles use the beach to nest each year. Occasionally green and Kemp's Ridley sea turtles will nest within the park boundary as well.

Gallery

References

External links
 Florida State Parks

Parks in Escambia County, Florida
State parks of Florida